Jill Heinerth (born 1965) is a Canadian cave diver, underwater explorer, writer, photographer and film-maker. She has made TV series for PBS, National Geographic Channel and the BBC, consulted on movies for directors including James Cameron, written several books and produced documentaries including We Are Water and Ben's Vortex, about the disappearance of Ben McDaniel.

Early life and education

As a child, Heinerth was inspired by Jacques Cousteau's television series. In 5th grade, she gave a Science Fair project about mysterious disappearances in the Bermuda Triangle. She gained a Bachelor of Fine Arts in Visual Communications Design at York University, and ran a small graphic design agency in Toronto while teaching scuba in Lake Huron's port of Tobermory in the evenings.

Career
In 1991, Heinerth quit her office job and moved to the Cayman Islands to dive full-time, honing skills in underwater photography. She then moved to Florida to work on cave diving, where she was mentored by documentary filmmaker Wes Skiles. She collaborated with his Karst Productions, based in High Springs, Florida.

In 1998, Heinerth was part of the team that made the first 3D map of an underwater cave. 
Heinerth became the first person to dive the ice caves of Antarctica, penetrating further into an underwater cave system than any woman ever In 2001, she was part of a team that explored ice caves of icebergs where she and her then husband Paul Heinerth "discovered wondrous life and magical vistas" and experienced the calving of an iceberg, documented in the film Ice Island.

In 2015, Heinerth participated in exploring the numerous anchialine caves of Christmas Island.

She consults on training programmes for diving agencies, publishes photojournalism in a range of magazines and speaks around the world.

Heinerth has written opinion pieces and articles about exploration and climate change for global publications including the Los Angeles Times.

In 2020, Heinerth spoke with the podcast This is Love about diving in ice caves in Antarctica.

Jill Heinerth is a prolific public speaker and educator represented by Speaker's Spotlight agency.

In 2020 Heinerth was interviewed on many radio, TV and podcasts programs including the NPR radio program Fresh Air.

Personal life
Heinerth married cave diver Paul Heinerth in 1996; they later divorced. In April 2007, she married her second husband, writer, photographer, and new media expert Robert McClellan, with whom she lives in Carleton Place, Ontario, Canada. Heinerth has described her hobbies as hiking, kayaking and cycling; "My favorite pastime is getting up at dawn and cycling to my local spring where a robust swim against the current of the Santa Fe River starts my day on the right track."

Works

Bibliography 

Heinerth, Jill (2019). Into The Planet: My Life as a Cave Diver. Ecco. 
Heinerth, Jill (2021). The Aquanaut. Tundra Books.

Film
She has produced TV series for PBS, National Geographic Channel, Discovery Channel and the BBC, consulted on movies for directors including James Cameron. She has produced documentaries including We Are Water and Ben's Vortex.

Jill hosted and shot underwater videography for the Under Thin Ice episode of The Nature of Things with David Suzuki on the CBC Television Network. Produced by the award-winning GalaFilm of Montreal, Canada.

Awards

In 2012, Heinerth was named the "Sea Hero of the Year" by SCUBA Diving Magazine.

Heinerth is a member of the Explorers Club, a fellow of the National Speleological Society, and she has been inducted into the Women Divers Hall of Fame.
She won the OZTek Media Award in March 2013. In November 2013, she was awarded the first ever Christopher Ondaatje Medal for Exploration by the Royal Canadian Geographical Society.
 
In June 2016, Heinerth was named as the first Explorer-in-Residence for the Royal Canadian Geographical Society.

In January 2017, the Academy of Underwater Arts and Sciences announced that Jill Heinerth was to become a 2017 AUAS Fellow by receiving an NOGI Award for ‘Sports & Education’.

Later that year, on 7 March 2017, the Governor General of Canada announced that Jill Heinerth was to receive the Canadian Polar Medal.

In March 2018 Jill Heinerth was awarded the Beneath The Sea Diver of the Year (Education) Award.

On 18 August 2020 it was announced that Jill Heinerth would be inducted into the International SCUBA Diving Hall of Fame. Due to the COVID-19 pandemic the induction will be delayed until 2021.

In February 2021 Jill's Children's book The Aquanaut was selected by Dolly Parton as a Blue Ribbon Selection of Dolly Parton's Imagination Library.

References

External links 

Living people
Canadian underwater divers
Underwater photographers
Cave diving explorers
Underwater filmmakers
1965 births